27th Regiment may refer to:

27th (Inniskilling) Regiment of Foot, infantry regiment of the British Army
27th Marine Regiment (United States), deactivated infantry regiment of the United States Marine Corps
27th Infantry Regiment, unit of the United States Army established in 1901
27th Connecticut Infantry Regiment
27th Maine Volunteer Infantry Regiment
27th Illinois Infantry Regiment
27th Indiana Infantry Regiment
27th Iowa Volunteer Infantry Regiment
27th Regiment Kentucky Volunteer Infantry
27th Michigan Volunteer Infantry Regiment
27th New Jersey Volunteer Infantry Regiment
27th New York Infantry Regiment
27th New York Volunteer Infantry Regiment (1873)
27th Wisconsin Volunteer Infantry Regiment
27th Punjabis, infantry regiment of the British Indian Army
27th Lancers, temporary cavalry regiment of the British Army from 1941 to 1945

See also
 27th Army (disambiguation)
 27th Battalion (disambiguation)
 27th Brigade (disambiguation)
 XXVII Corps (disambiguation)
 27th Division (disambiguation)
 27 Squadron (disambiguation)